A joint assault signal company (JASCO) was a joint service unit that provided ship to shore, air to ground communications to coordinate and control Naval Gunfire and Close Air Support to the United States Army. They were composed of specially trained Marines, Sailors and Army officers and enlisted. The Army component was composed of Air Liaison Officers, modern day Forward Air Controllers and enlisted communications technicians. JASCOs were created in the Pacific because of communication clutter, too many small teams to be effective. After the costly invasion of Tarawa the need for centralized command and control of air and naval fire support, utilizing Navy, Marine or Army gunners, spotters and radiomen was seen. Based on the Guadalcanal experience of Major General Alexander A. Vandergrift the Joint Assault Signal Companies were formed.

Background 
The formation of JASCOs parallels the formation of US Army Pathfinder teams. Because of a lack of foresight a deficiency was recognized and special units formed to correct the deficiency. The Pathfinder teams were formed to solve a problem discovered with the Battle of Sicily. Lacking guidance and control the paratroops were dropped all over the island. They managed to achieve their objectives due to the initiative and leadership of the officers and NCOs and the scattered airdrops made the occupying Germans feel overwhelmed. The German Fallschirmjäger had the same experience during the Battle of Crete; however, Adolf Hitler drew the wrong conclusion and never again committed his paratroops to an airborne operation, despite the great success they had at the Battle of Fort Eben-Emael during the attack on the Maginot Line. By contrast the US Army sought to rectify the problem by creating a special unit, which would jump in ahead of a parachute assault and mark the drop zones, providing terminal air guidance to the drop aircraft. These were Pathfinder units; JASCOs were a similar response to command and control deficiencies noted in the after action reports for The Battle of Guadalcanal and the Battle of Tarawa.

Units 

The first Joint Assault Signal Company (JASCO) was formed in October 1943 as a battalion-sized unit named the 1st Joint Assault Signal Company attached to the 4th Marine Division, under command of Lieutenant Colonel James G. Bishop Jr, Captain Murrary L. Thompson (Executive officer), Warrant Officer William T. Farrar Jr (Adjutant).

The Navajo code talkers were under their command.

JASCOs did not operate as a single unit, but were composed of 13 detachments supplied to Army and Marine divisions, regiments and battalions. Although JASCO units were first created for the United States Navy to coordinate ship-to-shore communications for naval gunfire and air support operations, they included United States Army personnel, Army pilots and enlisted communication personnel. As the Pacific War advanced the need for more JASCO units was realized, and units were created and attached to Marine divisions. By the time of invasion of the Philippines, the U.S, Army was creating its own JASCO's to support its infantry divisions. These JASCOs were primarily staffed by Army personnel, but had US Navy personnel as well. Each JASCO was divided into a battalion shore and beach party communication section, a shore fire control section, and an air liaison section, with each section further subdivided into teams.

Unit assignments 

Each Marine division had their own JASCO as follows:

1st Joint Assault Signal Party, Signal Company – 1st Provisional Marine Brigade
1st JASCO – 4th Marine Division
2nd JASCO – 2nd Marine Division
3rd JASCO – 3rd Marine Division
4th JASCO – 1st Marine Division reorganized after Pelliu into 1st JASCO
5th JASCO – 5th Marine Division
6th JASCO – 6th Marine Division

Operations 
JASCOs took part in the following Pacific Theater Operations:

US Marine Corp JASCOs

1st JASCO: Roi-Namur, Saipan, Tinian, Iwo Jima
2nd JASCO: Enewitok, Saipan, Tinian
3rd JASCO: Guam, Iwo Jima
4th JASCO: Peleliu, Okinawa
5th JASCO: Iwo Jima
6th JASCO: Okinawa
1st Joint Assault Signal Party: Guam
US Army JASCOs
74th JASCO Okinawa
75th JASCO Army – southern half Kwajalein, Marshall Islands attached 7th Infantry Division (US Army)
292nd JASCO Okinawa
295th JASCO Army – Kwajalein-Marshall Islands, Marianas and Guam – Marshall Islands attached 27th Infantry Division
593rd JASCO: Leyte Gulf,P.I., Okinawa
594th JASCO Okinawa
1st Joint Assault Signal Party: Guam

Marshall Islands

The first JASCO operation involved the 1st JASCO and the capture of the island Roi-Namur, the northern half of the Battle of Kwajalein, Marshall Islands, attached to the 4th Marine Division (United States) under command of Major General Holland Smith's V Amphibious Corps. Landing on 1 February, the islands were seized and cleared the next day. No JASCO casualties were incurred. The short duration of the battle was, in essence, a live fire training operation, which enabled JASCO to work out some kinks. After the operation, on 24 August 1944 they returned to Hawaii for refitting and training.

Mariana Islands

The next operation was in the Mariana Islands, the capture of Tinian and Saipan. The battle of Saipan lasted from 15 June to 9 July 1944, while the battle of Tinian was from 24 July to 1 August 1944. The battle cost JASCO 4 officers and11 enlisted dead, 6 officers and 9 enlisted wounded, and 5 enlisted MIA. The communications teams of the 1st JASCO were the key to controlling the complex amphibian operation.

On Tinian, Navajo code talkers were used only on a few occasions and proved unsatisfactory due to the time it took to decipher long encrypted communications.

Iwo Jima

Participating JASCOs were:

1st JASCO assigned 4th Marine Division
3rd JASCO assigned 3rd Marine Division
5th JASCO assigned 5th Marine Division

The after action report for the 1st JASCO was critical of the Army component, stating that while the enlisted personnel were well trained, the officers provided were grounded pilots, and the qualifications of half of them "left much to be desired". The report also indicated a priority need for replacement personnel. There was such a loss of equipment, that the first two months of training back in Hawaii had to be limited to physical training, weapons training, and classroom work.

Okinawa
The following JASCO units took part in the Battle of Okinawa:

 1st JASCO attached to 4th Marine Division
 4th JASCO attached 1st Marine Division
 6th JASCO attached 6th Marine Division
 292nd JASCO attached 77th Infantry Division
 593rd JASCO attached 96th Inantry Division
 594th JASCO attached 27th Infantry Division
 74th JASCO, attached 7th Infantry Division

Central Pacific Army JASCOs 
Two Army JASCOs supported the Central Pacific. These were:

75th JASCO Army – southern half Kwajalein, Marshall Islands attached 7th Infantry Division (US Army)
295th JASCO Army – Kwajalein-Marshall Islands, Marianas and Guam – Marshall Islands attached 27th Infantry Division (US Army)

By the time of the Okinawa landing, the JASCO had improved its communications and transportation capabilities, with new equipment including radio jeeps.

Air Liaison Parties (ALPs) from the Joint Assault Signal Companies (JASCOs) attached to each division enabled the smooth functioning of coordinating agencies and front line direction of close air support from carrier aircraft and Tactical Air Force at 10th Army Headquarters.

Africa and Europe 
In the African Campaign JASCO units were part of special engineer battalions, performing the same duties with a mix of Army and Naval personnel.

On 6 June 1944 there were three distinct JASCO units storming the beaches of Normandy. They were:

 293rd JASCO
 294th JASCO
 296th JASCO

Legacy 
JASCO units were disbanded and their responsibility transferred to the US Navy with the signing of the National Security Act of 1947, at that time the Marine Corps began recreating JASCO capability under the ANGLICO designation. The United States Army created its own JASCO units for the European Theater of Operations. Its function has been incorporated into the Signal Corps (United States Army).

References

Further reading 
 Ruppenthal, Logistical Support, 1: 282–85 and ch. 8.
 Thompson and Harris, Outcome, pp. 231–33; 
 TOE 11-147S (21 October 1943) – for the organization of the JASCO
 Vincent W. Fox, The Role of the JASCO, [1947], typescript in file of 592d Signal Company, DAMH-HSO;

Companies of the United States Marine Corps
Military communications units and formations
Joint military units and formations of the United States